Colin Mackay may refer to:

 Colin Mackay (writer) (1951–2003), poet and novelist
 Colin Mackay (journalist), Scottish journalist (Holyrood editor, STV News)
 Colin Mackay (judge) (born 1943), British judge
 Colin B. Mackay (1920–2003), president of the University of New Brunswick, 1953–1969
 Colin MacKay (1908–1989), Australian rules footballer